Never Say Never a 2008 album by former Small Faces and Faces keyboardist Ian McLagan. It is McLagan's sixth full studio album. Never Say Never was released on February 28, 2008 on McLagan's own Maniac Records. McLagan had worked sporadically on the album since before recording and releasing Spiritual Boy, his tribute album to former bandmate Ronnie Lane, in 2006.

Track listing
All tracks composed by Ian McLagan
 "Never Say Never" - 3:35
 "A Little Black Number" - 3:13
 "I Will Follow" - 3:54
 "Where Angels Hide" - 3:34
 "Killing Me With Love" - 2:53
 "An Innocent Man" - 4:07
 "My Irish Rose" - 4:25
 "I'm Hot, You're Cool" - 3:20
 "Loverman" - 2:12
 "When The Crying is Over" - 3:43

Personnel
 Ian McLagan - vocals, Wurlitzer electric piano, Hammond B3 organ, artwork, design 
 "Scrappy" Jud Newcomb - guitar, vocals
 Mark Andes - bass, vocals
 Don Harvey - drums
with:
Brian Standefer - cello (1)
Patty Griffin - vocals (1, 8, 9, 10)
Michael Ramos - trumpet (2)
George Reiff - bass and ukulele (5)
Michael Longoria - percussion (6, 7)
The Tosca Strings - strings (10), arranged by Stephen Barber
Technical
Glyn Johns - mixing, mastering
Theresa DiMenno - cover photography

References

2008 albums
Ian McLagan albums